Ray Foxx (born 10 December 1985) is an English DJ and music producer who is best known for his hit single "Boom Boom (Heartbeat)" which has peaked at number 12 on the UK Singles Chart.

Music career

2011–12: Early career
In July 2011 Ray Foxx released his debut single "The Trumpeter" through Defected Records. The track gained radio support from the likes of Annie Mac, Trevor Nelson, Zane Lowe and DJ Target. In September 2011 he re-released the single as "La Musica", featuring vocals from Lovelle. The new vocal version became his first charting single peaking at number 65 in the UK Singles Chart. The song also received success charting at number 15 in the UK Dance Chart and number 9 in the UK Indie Chart, as well as topping the UK Indie Breakers Chart. In April 2012 he released the single "Butterflies".

2013–present: Breakthrough
Newly signed to the Strictly Rhythm label, he released the single "Boom Boom (Heartbeat)" in August 2013. The song features vocals from Rachel K Collier. The song has peaked to number 12 on the UK Singles Chart, making it his first UK Top 20 single. The song has also peaked to number 2 on the UK Dance Chart and number 13 on the Scottish Singles Chart. His follow-up single, "Fireworks (Bang Bang)", featuring vocalist and fellow Londoner J Warner, was released mid-December the same year.

Discography

Singles

References

External links
 Official Website
 
 
 
 

British DJs
English DJs
English dance musicians
English house musicians
Musicians from London
DJs from London
1985 births
Living people
Electronic dance music DJs